The Libel Act 1792 (32 Geo. III c. 60) (also known as Fox's Act) was an Act of the Parliament of Great Britain. At the urging of the Whig politician Charles James Fox, the Act restored to juries the right to decide what was libel and whether a defendant was guilty, rather than leaving it solely to the judge. The Act was repealed by the Coroners and Justice Act 2009, Sched.23 Part 2, with effect from 12 January 2010; this abolished the criminal libel laws.

The Act itself only applied to criminal trials, but the rules it created have come to be applied in civil trials.

Edmund Burke presented a similar bill in 1791. Charles James Fox opposed it and it was not passed.

References

External links

Great Britain Acts of Parliament 1792
United Kingdom defamation law